Ansonia hanitschi (common name: Kadamaian stream toad) is a species of toad in the family Bufonidae. It is endemic to mountains of Borneo and found in both Malaysia (Sarawak and Sabah) and Indonesia (northern Kalimantan).
Its natural habitats are submontane and montane forests. It inhabits the forest floor. Breeding takes place in clear, rocky mountain streams. It is threatened by habitat loss (siltation of streams needed for larval development, clearance of forests for cultivation).

References

hanitschi
Endemic fauna of Borneo
Amphibians of Indonesia
Amphibians of Malaysia
Amphibians described in 1960
Taxa named by Robert F. Inger
Taxonomy articles created by Polbot
Amphibians of Borneo
Fauna of the Borneo montane rain forests